The 2016 UCI Mountain Bike & Trials World Championships was the 27th edition of the UCI Mountain Bike & Trials World Championships. Unlike in previous years, the world championships for the various disciplines were held at two different locations. The world championships in cross-country were held in Nové Město na Moravě, Czech Republic from 28 June to 3 July 2016. The downhill, four-cross, and trials events were held at Val di Sole, Italy from 29 August to 11 September 2016.

Medal summary

Men's events

Women's events

Team events

Medal table

See also
2016 UCI Mountain Bike World Cup

References

External links
The events on the UCI website
Official website of the Nové Město event
Official website of the Val di Sole event

UCI Mountain Bike World Championships
International cycle races hosted by the Czech Republic
UCI Mountain Bike World Championships
UCI Mountain Bike